Lord Charles James Fox Russell (10 February 1807 – 29 June 1894), was a British soldier and Whig politician.

Background
Russell was the third son of John Russell, 6th Duke of Bedford, by his second wife Lady Georgiana, daughter of Alexander Gordon, 4th Duke of Gordon. Francis Russell, 7th Duke of Bedford, Lord George Russell and John Russell, 1st Earl Russell were his elder half-brothers and Lord Edward Russell and Lord Alexander Russell his full brothers.

Cricket
An amateur cricketer, Russell played first-class cricket for the Marylebone Cricket Club between 1833 and 1846.

Career
Russell was a Lieutenant-Colonel in both the 52nd Regiment and the Royal Horse Guards. In 1832 he was returned to Parliament for Bedfordshire, a seat he held until 1841 and again briefly in 1847. In 1848 he was appointed Serjeant-at-Arms of the House of Commons, which he remained until 1875.

Family
Russell married Isabella Clarissa, daughter of William Griffith Davies, in 1834. They had two sons, of whom the youngest was George W. E. Russell, and three daughters. Lady Charles Russell died in June 1884. Russell survived her by ten years and died in June 1894, aged 87.

Ancestry

References

External links 
 

1807 births
1894 deaths
Younger sons of dukes
Members of the Parliament of the United Kingdom for English constituencies
UK MPs 1832–1835
UK MPs 1835–1837
UK MPs 1837–1841
UK MPs 1841–1847
Charles
Whig (British political party) MPs
English cricketers
Marylebone Cricket Club cricketers
English cricketers of 1826 to 1863
Serjeants-at-Arms of the British House of Commons
A to K v L to Z cricketers
Over 36 v Under 36 cricketers